Logos Dictionary is a large multilingual online dictionary provided by Logos Group, a European translation company.  It was started in 1995, and as of 2005 contains over 7 million terms in over 200 languages, some of them minority languages as Breton, Leonese, Scots or Venetian.  The dictionary offers a variety of search options, and requires free registration in order to add or update translations.

There is also a Logos Dictionary for Children where mainly words for kids can be found, and a quote citation in several languages.

See also
 Endangered languages

External links
 Logos dictionary

Online dictionaries
Leonese language
Breton language
Scots language
Venetian language